Fulda bernieri is a species of butterfly in the family Hesperiidae. It is found on Madagascar (the east and Ile Sainte Marie). The habitat consists of forest margins and cleared forests.

References

Butterflies described in 1833
Astictopterini